Randolph Engineering, Inc., located in Randolph, Massachusetts, manufactures and sells sunglasses, shooting glasses, and prescription glasses. Randolph Engineering, Inc. is also the prime contractor for aviator sunglasses to the United States military.

History
Jan Waszkiewicz and Stanley Zaleski formed the company in 1972 in Randolph, Massachusetts, where the company remains to this day.

Jan Waszkiewicz was born in Poland, but he and his family fled Poland on Christmas Eve 1939 after the Germans overran Poland. His long journey took him through Czechoslovakia, Hungary, Italy and into southern France. He joined the French Army, but soon was captured and became a prisoner of war for three months.

He soon escaped and fled to Switzerland and then to England, where he joined the English Army and later became a Royal Air Force navigator, flying 32 bomber missions. He had heard a lot of stories about America and at the end of the war settled in Boston, Massachusetts, because it was culturally similar to Europe.

After arriving in Boston he continued his education at Northeastern University and got a job as a tool and die maker. He later found employment at the American Optical Company and then Marine Optical.

Convinced that he could design and manufacture better eyeglass frame manufacturing equipment, he and his partner Stanley Zaleski formed Randolph Engineering, Inc. in 1972.

The company originally focused on designing and manufacturing optical tools and machinery for the production of eyewear. Waszkiewicz and Zaleski designed and made most of the machinery in their plant, but over time the company turned its attention to making its own eyewear, using the tools and machinery designed and manufactured by their company.

In 1977, Randolph Engineering obtained its first government contract. By 1982, they had become the prime contractor for military-style Type HGU-4/P aviator sunglasses for the United States Department of Defense. With 68 employees, 200,000 pairs of sunglasses were made for the Navy, Air Force, and Army that year.

Since that time they have provided eyewear for many government agencies, ranging from sunglasses for air force pilots to eyewear for submarine personnel. In the early 1990s, sales were expanded to offer their products to the consumer marketplace. By August 2008, the company had expanded its eyewear offerings to include other specialty lines of sunglasses for police, security personnel, outdoor sports enthusiasts and other sight-critical occupations and outdoor enthusiasts.

Presently the company supplies the military with a variety of glasses and frames including contracts with the Defense Logistics Agency worth $9 million each. The current contract is valued at $38,662,664 and was issued on December 23, 2011.

In 2011, the company had approximately $8 million in sales.

All glasses are made at the U.S. location in Randolph, Massachusetts using only a handful of international components. Sales are handled through their website, large retailers and worldwide distributors. Randolph Engineering has positioned itself as a vendor to other Air Forces around the world, including Australia, Belgium, Israel, and Jordan.

The Alliance for the Commonwealth and the Massachusetts Port Authority awarded Randolph the 1997 Massachusetts Product Export Achievement Award in recognition of achievements made in International trade.

The flight marked the first transcontinental flight and round trip completed in a light aircraft powered by biofuel, which is made with a blend of renewable Camelina plant seed oil.

Notable products
Randolph Engineering has three categories of products: the Sunglass Series, Ranger Series, and Rx Series.

Sunglasses

 Aviator — MIL-SPEC HGU4/P military-style sunglasses
 Concorde — teardrop aviator shape like those worn by U.S. military pilots throughout World War II
 Crew Chief — typical of the style worn by aircraft mechanics and line personnel
 Intruder — larger lens design for more eye coverage in the classic aviator style
 P3 — also known as the Submariner; standard issue for the U.S. Navy
 Raptor — wrap-around design to increase side protection
 Sportsman — teardrop-shape sunglasses
 Corsair — named for the Vought F4U Corsair

Shooting glasses
 Ranger Falcon — one-piece shield design lens
 Ranger XLW — 8-base wrap frame specifically made for sport shooting
 Ranger Edge — co-designed by the shooting industry's top opticians for professional optical performance
 Ranger Classic — Randolph's first shooting frame
 Ranger Sporter — designed to accommodate nearly any prescription

Manufacturing processes
Randolph Engineering produces shooting eyewear, sunglasses, and prescription eyewear. Their products come in a variety of lens and frame styles, the most popular being the traditional aviator style. Each pair of sunglasses is made nearly entirely by hand in a detailed 200-step process. An average of 53,000 pairs of glasses are produced per month. All manufacturing processes take place at the company's 22,000-square-foot facility in the United States.

Randolph Engineering also produces their own high-strength solder flux, and every pair of their glasses comes with a lifetime replacement guarantee for every solder joint. Navy pilots and Army helicopter pilots both wear Randolph's matte chrome 52 mm Aviators. In 2011, Randolph Engineering also began production of the Michael Bastian Signature Series.
Today, products are sold in over 400 retailers globally and compete with brands like Ray-Ban and Oakley.

References

American companies established in 1972
Companies based in Norfolk County, Massachusetts
Companies based in Massachusetts
Eyewear brands of the United States
Manufacturing companies based in Massachusetts
Randolph, Massachusetts
Sunglasses
Eyewear companies of the United States
1972 establishments in Massachusetts